Arthur Hugh Inkster (4 May 1866 – 29 March 1907) was an Australian politician who represented the South Australian House of Assembly multi-member seat of Flinders from 1905 to 1907, joining the Liberal and Democratic Union in 1906.

References

1866 births
1907 deaths
People from Riverton, South Australia
Members of the South Australian House of Assembly
19th-century Australian politicians